Punjabi language films are produced both in India and Pakistan.
 List of Pakistani Punjabi-language films
 List of Indian Punjabi films

Lists of films by language